Elena Pavlovna (24 December 1784 [OS 13 December] – 24 September 1803) was born a grand duchess of Russia as the daughter of Paul I, Emperor of all the Russias and later became the Hereditary Princess of Mecklenburg-Schwerin as the wife of Hereditary Prince Frederick Louis (1778–1819).

Early life

Grand Duchess Elena Pavlovna Romanova of Russia was born in Saint Petersburg in the Russian Empire as the fourth child and second daughter of Tsesarevich Paul Petrovich of Russia (1754–1801) and his second wife, Tsesarevna Maria Feodorovna, born Duchess Sophie Dorothea of Württemberg (1759–1828). Out of her nine siblings, Elena was closest to her older sister Alexandra Pavlovna (1783–1801). She was educated privately at home, for the first years, under the supervision of her paternal grandmother, Catherine the Great (1729–1796). Her education was focused mainly on fine arts, literature and music.

Marriage and life in Schwerin

Marriage 
In 1798, negotiations took place about the marriage of Elena Pavlovna and the heir of the Duchy of Mecklenburg-Schwerin, Hereditary Prince Frederick Louis (1778–1819), the eldest son of Frederick Francis I, Duke of Mecklenburg-Schwerin. The formal betrothal was celebrated on 5 May 1799, and on 23 October 1799, they were married at the Great Gatchina Palace near Saint Petersbourg

Life in Schwerin 
Elena Pavlovna moved to Schwerin with her husband and led a content married life there. On 15 September 1800 she gave birth to her firstborn son, Paul Frederick, who would go on to inherit the throne of the duchy. He was named after his grandfathers. On 16 March 1801, Elena Pavlovna's sister Archduchess Alexandra Pavlovna of Austria died in Buda in childbirth. Only eight days later her father was assassinated. On 31 March 1803 she gave birth to a daughter, Marie Louise, named after her grandmothers, who would later become the duchess of Saxe-Altenburg.

Death 
In September 1803, Elena Pavlovna fell gravely ill and died suddenly on 24 September. She was buried in the Helena Paulovna Mausoleum in Ludwigslust. Her widower, Frederick Louis remarried two times and had more children, but never succeeded to the throne, as his father outlived him.

Issue 
Hereditary Grand Duchess Elena Pavlovna had two children with her husband, Frederick Louis, Hereditary Grand Duke of Mecklenburg-Schwerin (1778–1819), both of whom survived to adulthood:

 Paul Frederick, Grand Duke of Mecklenburg-Schwerin (15 September 1800 – 7 March 1842), who inherited the throne of the duchy, married Princess Alexandrine of Prussia (1803–1892) in 1822 and had issue.
 Marie Louise Friederike Alexandrine Elizabeth Charlotte Catherine, Duchess of Saxe-Altenburg (31 March 1803 – 26 October 1862), who married Georg, Duke of Saxe-Altenburg on 7 October 1825 and had issue.

Letters
Elena Pavlovna's letters to her maternal grandfather, Frederick II Eugene, Duke of Württemberg written between 1795 and 1797 are preserved in the State Archive of Stuttgart in Stuttgart, Germany.

Ancestry

References

Bibliography
 Alan Palmer: Alexander I.
 Zoé Oldenbourg: Katharina II.

1784 births
1803 deaths
Royalty from Saint Petersburg
House of Holstein-Gottorp-Romanov
Russian grand duchesses
Hereditary Grand Duchesses of Mecklenburg-Schwerin
18th-century people from the Russian Empire
19th-century people from the Russian Empire
18th-century women from the Russian Empire
19th-century women from the Russian Empire
Daughters of Russian emperors
Children of Paul I of Russia